Pearl Beach may refer to:

 Pearl Beach, New South Wales, Australia
 Pearl Beach, St. Clair County, Michigan, U.S., on the St. Clair River
 Pearl Beach, Branch County, Michigan, U.S., an unincorporated community on Coldwater Lake